East English Village Preparatory Academy (EEVPA) is a magnet high school in Detroit, Michigan. It is a part of Detroit Public Schools.

The school was built on the original site of Finney High School. It opened in 2012.

Campus
The $46.3 million,  campus has room for up to 1,200 students. It has four academic wings, including a performing arts wing. The school features a media center, an athletic complex with a community health clinic, and eight science laboratories.

Academics

Admissions
The school has an attendance boundary which automatically grants students living within that area admission to the school. Students living outside of the boundary have to apply to the school and undergo an interview. The prospective students must have at least a 2.5 GPA.

Notable alumni
Chauncey Golston - NFL player
Desmond King - NFL player

References

External links

 East English Village Preparatory Academy

Public high schools in Michigan
High schools in Detroit
Educational institutions established in 2012
2012 establishments in Michigan
Detroit Public Schools Community District